The Flood is the 1975 short story collection by the Syrian writer Ḥaidar Ḥaidar. The collection includes 11 short stories, all revolving around the suppression and oppression faced by Arab countries post liberation revolutions. Similar to his other works, Ḥaidar Ḥaidar employs stream-of-consciousness in his collection, where he focuses on the psychology of the Arab world and the inner machinations of nationalistic pioneers.

Stories in the collection 
11 short stories make up the collection:

 Al-Namlu Wal Qat 
 Al-Rihan 
 Al-Zawaghan (The Illusion)
 Ughniya Ḥazina Li Rajulin Kana Ḥayyan
 Man Allathi Yathkuru Al-Ghaba?
 Ṣamtu An-Nar
 Al-Ightiyal
 Al-Fayḍān
 Al-Juuʿ Wal Luṣuṣ Wal Qatala
 Al-Barabira
 Wishaḥun Wardiyun Li Rajulin Waḥid

Author's statements 
Ḥaidar Ḥaidar attributes his use of stream-of-consciousness to his childhood, for he stated that the recollections of childhood put him in a state closer to dreams than reality. He also critiqued traditional Arabic narratives, saying that they simplify reality by narrating it as it is without looking at the inner machinations of the characters. Despite being Syrian, Ḥaidar Ḥaidar looks at all Arab countries as a single united cause. His narratives are often cynical; however, he does not look at the tragedy of Arab countries as inevitable and unchangeable; contrarily, he frames reality as changeable and reformable, and necessarily so. His short story collection, ‘The Flood’, embodies those features.

Complete works of Ḥaidar Ḥaidar 
 A Feast for the Seaweeds (Novel) 
 The Desolate Time (Novel) 
 The Mirrors of Fire (Novel) 
 Elgies of Days: Three Stories on Death (Novel) 
 Immigration of Swallows (Novel) 
 Al-Fahd (Novel) 
 Al-Fayḍān (Short Stories) 
 Ighwā’ (Short Stories) 
 Al-Wuʿul (The Deer) (Short Stories) 
 Al-Wamḍ (Short Stories) 
 Al-Tamawujāt (Two Stories) 
 Awraqul Manfa: Shahadatun Ḥawla Zamanuna

References 

Syrian short stories
Syrian short story collections
Syrian literature